Sabrina Horvat (born 3 July 1997) is an Austrian footballer who plays as a defender for German ÖFB-Frauenliga club FFC Vorderland and the Austria women's national team.

References

External links

1997 births
Living people
Women's association football defenders
Austrian women's footballers
Austria women's international footballers
Swiss Women's Super League players
FC Basel Frauen players
Frauen-Bundesliga players
SV Werder Bremen (women) players
1. FC Köln (women) players
Austrian expatriate women's footballers
Austrian expatriate sportspeople in Switzerland
Expatriate women's footballers in Switzerland
Austrian expatriate sportspeople in Germany
Expatriate women's footballers in Germany